Stuttgart is one of the four administrative districts (Regierungsbezirke) of Baden-Württemberg, Germany, located in the north-east of the state of Baden-Württemberg, in the southwestern part of Germany. It is sub-divided into the three regions: Heilbronn-Franken, Ostwürttemberg and Stuttgart.

The districts of Böblingen, Esslingen, Ludwigsburg, Rems-Murr and Göppingen form with the city of Stuttgart the Verband Region Stuttgart with a directly elected regional assembly (Regionalversammlung).

Economy 
The Gross domestic product (GDP) of the region was 213.4 billion € in 2018, accounting for 6.4% of German economic output. GDP per capita adjusted for purchasing power was 47,400 € or 157% of the EU27 average in the same year. The GDP per employee was 123% of the EU average. This makes it one of the wealthiest regions in Germany and Europe.

References

External links 
 

 
Geography of Baden-Württemberg
Government regions of Germany
NUTS 2 statistical regions of the European Union